Winnipeg Flood may refer to:

 1950 Red River flood
 1997 Red River flood